Robert Irvine Coyle (born 31 January 1946) is a former Northern Ireland international footballer. Coyle is the most successful manager in the history of the Irish Football League. He is the Director of Football at Glentoran.

Playing career
Coyle was a "teak tough" wing-half with Ballymena United, Glentoran, Sheffield Wednesday and Grimsby Town. He won two Irish League titles and played in Europe six times while with Glentoran before winning five Northern Ireland international caps while playing for Sheffield Wednesday.

Management career

Linfield
Roy Coyle became player-manager of Linfield in 1975. In his first couple of years at the club, Coyle got Linfield into the Irish Cup final but lost to Carrick Rangers A year later they lost in the Irish Cup final again, but this time to Coleraine F.C. The Linfield board decided to give Coyle another chance and that decision proved to be one of the best decisions ever made in Irish League football. Roy Coyle won 31 trophies with Linfield and left the club in 1990 after his contract was terminated.

Ards
In 1990, Coyle was appointed manager of County Down club Ards after leaving Linfield but he resigned the following year.

Derry City
Coyle was appointed manager of Derry City in 1991. He stayed for two years and won the League of Ireland Cup as well as guiding the team to the runner-up position in 1991–92. In 1993, Coyle left and returned to Ards.

Return to Ards
Coyle returned to the County Down side in 1993 and won two trophies, the County Antrim Shield and the Irish League Cup. Coyle stayed at the club for four years.

Glentoran
Roy Coyle shocked the Irish League by becoming the new manager of Glentoran after the sacking of Tommy Cassidy. Even though Coyle played for Glentoran, it took some of the fans a while to get used to him after managing their bitter rivals Linfield. Coyle brought that success he had with Linfield and became Glentoran's most successful manager ever by winning 16 trophies with Glentoran. In 2006, after winning the league, Glentoran started to have a string of poor results. The fans started to turn against Coyle and the players. Then an away match to Armagh City saw Glentoran crashing to a 5–2 defeat at Holm Park. At the final whistle, Glentoran fans booed the players and as Coyle walked by, some of the fans nearby shouted "Coyle Out!" Coyle resigned that evening. He was replaced by Newry City manager Paul Millar.

Newry City
Coyle swapped clubs with Paul Millar who went to be Glentoran's new manager. Coyle only stayed for a couple of months and decided to retire. A year later Coyle was linked to a move to Glenavon but the job went to former Cliftonville and Coleraine manager Marty Quinn.

Return to Glentoran
Coyle returned to Glentoran as the Club's Director Of Football when Scott Young was appointed as the new First Team Manager for the East Belfast club. Coyle took charge of the team during Glentoran's Europa League qualifications while Young was completing his coaching badges. On 14 January 2012, Young resigned from the club, and Coyle was put in charge for Glentoran's game away to Ballymena United a match where the Glens won 3–0 in his first game back at the helm. Coyle also agreed to be caretaker manager at the club until they appointed a new manager. Coyle was in charge of first team duties until 22 February when former Cliftonville manager Eddie Patterson was appointed new Glentoran boss. Coyle returned to his duties as Director of Football.

After Eddie Patterson was sacked as Glentoran Manager on 17 October 2015, Coyle, still at the club in his role as Director of Football took the reins as Caretaker Manager once again whilst the club searched for a new manager. In August 2016 when Alan Kernaghan resigned as Glentoran manager, Coyle also returned to the role of Caretaker Manager.

Managerial honours
Coyle is the most successful manager in Irish League history and has won 50 trophies in a success-filled career, mostly with Linfield and Glentoran

Linfield (November 1975 - April 1990) 31 Trophies
Irish League (10) 1977/78, 1978/79, 1979/80, 1981/82, 1982/83, 1983/84, 1984/85, 1985/86, 1986/87, 1988/89
Irish Cup (3) 1977/78, 1979/80, 1981/82
Gold Cup (7) 1978/79, 1981/82, 1983/84, 1984/85, 1987/88, 1988/89, 1989/89, 1989/90
Ulster Cup (4) 1977/78, 1978/79, 1979/80, 1984/85
County Antrim Shield (5) 1976/77, 1980/81, 1981/82, 1982/83, 1983/84
Irish League Cup (1) 1986/87
Tyler All-Ireland Cup (1) 1980/81
Derry City (June 1991 - September 1993) 1 Trophy
League of Ireland Cup (1) 1991/92
Ards (October 1993 - November 1997) 2 Trophies
County Antrim Shield (1) 1993/94
Irish League Cup (1) 1994/95
Glentoran (November 1997 - February 2006) 17 Trophies
Irish League (3) 1998/99, 2002/03, 2004/05
Irish Cup (4) 1997/98, 1999/2000, 2000/01, 2003/04
Gold Cup (3) 1998/99, 1999/2000, 2000/01
County Antrim Shield (4) 1998/99, 1999/2000, 2001/02, 2002/03
Irish League Cup (3) 2000/01, 2002/03, 2004/05

References

External links
 Roy Coyle Northern Ireland's Footballing Greats

Living people
1946 births
Association football midfielders
Sheffield Wednesday F.C. players
League of Ireland managers
Ards F.C. managers
Derry City F.C. managers
Linfield F.C. managers
Grimsby Town F.C. players
Glentoran F.C. managers
Linfield F.C. players
Glentoran F.C. players
Ballymena United F.C. players
Association footballers from Northern Ireland
Northern Ireland international footballers
Football managers from Northern Ireland
Newry City F.C. managers
Northern Ireland amateur international footballers